Michael George Cowling is an Australian pure mathematician who was born in Melbourne, Victoria, Australia in 1949. He gained a BSc (Hons) (1971) from the Australian National University and a PhD (1974) from Flinders University. After rising to the rank of professor at the University of Genoa, he became Professor of Pure Mathematics at the University of New South Wales in 1983. His work centers on harmonic analysis, representation theory, partial differential equations and geometry of Lie groups. He was awarded the Australian Mathematical Society Medal in 1989, and he was elected as a fellow of the Australian Academy of Science in 1993. From 2004 to 2006 he was President of the Australian Mathematical Society.

After stepping down as the Head of the School of Mathematics and Statistics at UNSW, he moved to the United Kingdom to accept the Mason Chair at the University of Birmingham. He returned to UNSW in 2010.

Selected publications

External links
 Michael Cowling homepage
 Michael George Cowling
  University of New South Wales Profile page
 University of Birmingham School of Mathematics profile page

Academic staff of the University of New South Wales
1949 births
Living people
Fellows of the Australian Academy of Science
Mathematicians from Melbourne
Academics of the University of Birmingham